William Charles Kueffner (February 27, 1840 – March 18, 1893) was an officer in the Union Army during the American Civil War who served in the 9th Illinois Infantry in the Western Theater in several campaigns. He was later brevetted as a brigadier general for bravery in combat and was a noted attorney in southern Illinois following the war.

Biography
Kueffner was born in Germany. He lived in Mecklenburg before emigrating to the United States. He settled in the Hill Country of Texas in the German-American community, where he was an outspoken opponent of slavery. He moved North on the outbreak of the Civil War and relocated to Belleville, Illinois. He subsequently joined the Union Army and was commissioned as a captain in the 9th Illinois Infantry. Over the next four years, he took part in 110 engagements and was wounded four times.

Following his final battle wound, he was transferred to the 23rd Veterans Reserve Corps, with whom he served in non-combat areas. However, very late in the war, he had recovered sufficiently to become the colonel and commander of the 149th Illinois Volunteer Infantry. He was brevetted Brigadier General, U.S. Volunteers in the omnibus promotions following the war, backdated to March 13, 1865, for "gallant and meritorious services".

After the war, Kueffner was the collector of internal revenue for the 12th district of Illinois until removed in 1869 by order of President Ulysses S. Grant for political reasons. He then studied law, passed his bar exam, and established a profitable legal practice. He became one of Belleville's and Southern Illinois' most outstanding lawyers.
 
Kueffer died in the spring of 1893 at the age of 53. He was buried in the Walnut Hill Cemetery in Belleville. He is honored there with an impressive stone statue.

References

Union Army generals
German emigrants to the United States
People of Illinois in the American Civil War
People of Texas in the American Civil War
People from Belleville, Illinois
Illinois lawyers
1840 births
1893 deaths
19th-century American lawyers